Mundaka is a railway station in Mundaka, Basque Country, Spain. It is owned by Euskal Trenbide Sarea and operated by Euskotren. It lies on the Urdaibai line.

History 
The station opened, together with the rest of the Pedernales- extension of the Amorebieta-Pedernales line, on 16 August 1955. The sidings for freight traffic were removed in the 1970s.

Services 
The station is served by Euskotren Trena line E4. It runs every 30 minutes (in each direction) during weekdays, and every hour during weekends.

References

External links
 

Euskotren Trena stations
Railway stations in Biscay
Railway stations in Spain opened in 1955